Amaury Guichon (born 15 March 1991) is a French-Swiss pastry chef. He is known for his pastry designs and chocolate sculptures.

Early life and training
Guichon was born to a Swiss mother and a French father and grew up on the Haute-Savoie–Romandy border near Geneva. He has an older brother. In 2005 at the age of 14, he began his culinary training at the École Hôtelière Savoie Leman in Thonon-les-Bains and participating in local competitions. He perfected his pastry-making skills working at the Wolfisberg bakery in Geneva.

He took up an apprenticeship at the Maison Lenôtre in Paris. In 2010, he was awarded the title of Best Apprentice in France, by the council of the MOF association.

Career
After completing his training, Guichon was hired to run the Lenôtre boutique and school back in Cannes. He later returned to Paris to work as an executive pastry chef at the Hugo & Victor patisserie and chocolate shop; he reached the level of executive chef by the age of 21.

Guichon was a contestant on the France 2 reality cooking series Who will be the next great pastry chef? in 2013. Guichon placed third in the competition.

Guichon moved to the United States in 2014 upon receiving an invitation from Jean-Philippe Maury to work at the Las Vegas branch of his Patisserie, with shops in the Aria Resort and Casino and Bellagio. He worked as a private consultant and conducted masterclasses, leading Guichon to eventually co-found the Pastry Academy with Belgian chef Michel Ernots in the city of Las Vegas in 2019.

In 2016, Guichon began to post his desserts and chocolate creations on social media. He has gained over 19 million followers on TikTok and 11 million on Instagram.

Guichon's debut dessert cooking book The Art of Flavor was published on 13 December 2018.

Guichon hosted the 2021-2022 eight-episode reality series School of Chocolate on Netflix, a competition in which contestants construct chocolate sculptures with Guichon both guiding them and judging the final result.

Bibliography

Filmography

Accolades
 Apprentice Chocolate Showpiece Contest – 1st (2007 - 2009)
 Medalla de Oro (best apprentice) (2010)
 Délices de la Méditerranée – 1st (2012)
 Qui Sera le Prochain Grand Pâtissier? – 3rd (2013)

References

External links

Living people
1991 births
French chefs
French cookbook writers
French educators
French expatriates in the United States
French Internet celebrities
French people of Swiss descent
French television personalities
Food and cooking YouTubers
Pastry chefs
People from Cannes
Businesspeople from Geneva
Reality cooking competition contestants
Swiss chocolatiers
Swiss chefs
Swiss educators
Swiss expatriates in the United States
Swiss people of French descent
Swiss television personalities